Dactylopodida is an Amoebozoa grouping.

References

Amoebozoa orders
Discosea